Fritzi: A Revolutionary Tale is a 2019 German-language animated film directed by  and Matthias Bruhn about the Peaceful Revolution in Autumn 1989, told from the perspective of a twelve-year-old girl. A co-production between Germany, Luxembourg, Belgium  the Czech Republic and Austria. the film is based on the 2009 German children's book Fritzi was There by Hanna Schott.

Premise 
1989 in East Germany. Twelve-year-old Fritzi lovingly takes care of her best friend Sophie's dog Sputnik while Sophie's family is on vacation in Hungary. But when Sophie does not return, Fritzi and Sputnik set out in search of her. The film tells the story of the protests of the citizens against the Communist SED regime of Erich Honecker and Egon Krenz until the fall of the Berlin Wall on November 9, 1989.

Voice cast 
Naomi Hadad as Fritzi
Ben Hadad as Bela
Jördis Triebel as Julia
 as Frau Liesegang
Winfried Glatzeder as police officer
 as Klaus
Amelie Sophie von Redecke as Sophie
Jan Treviño Kräling as Hanno

Awards 
2019: Preis der deutschen Filmkritik – Best children's film, awarded by the German Film Critics Association
2020: Mitteldeutscher Rundfunk – Best screenplay at the 28th Goldener Spatz children's media festival in Erfurt
2020: "Rauchfrei-Siegel" by the German Cancer Aid and the Non-Smoking Action Alliance as the film "...deliberately dispenses with smoking characters and thus serves as a role model, especially for young people."

References

External links  

Fritzi – A Revolutionary Tale at Weltkino Films (in German)

Animated feature films
Belgian animated films
Films about the Berlin Wall
Films set in East Germany
2010s German films